2016 Summer Olympics marketing was a long running campaign that began when Rio won its bid to host the games in 2009.

Symbols

Emblem
The official emblem for the 2016 Summer Olympics was designed by the Brazilian agency Tatíl Design and unveiled on 31 December 2010, winning in a competition against 139 agencies. The logo represents three figures joined at their arms and feet, with the overall shape reflecting that of Sugarloaf Mountain. The emblem was also designed to have a three-dimensional form, which designer Fred Gelli claimed made it the "first 3D logo in the history of the Olympics."

The logo has been noted as evoking Henri Matisse's painting Dance. There were also allegations by the Colorado-based Telluride Foundation that the logo had been plagiarised from its own. While also consisting of several figures linked in motion, the Telluride Foundation logo contains four figures. This is not the first time that the foundation had alleged plagiarism of its logo by a Brazilian event; in 2004, the linked figures element had been copied for the logo of Carnival celebrations in Salvador. Gelli defended the allegations, stating that the concept of figures linked in embrace was not inherently original as it was "an ancient reference" and "in the collective unconscious". Gelli cited Dance as an influence of the logo's concept, and stated that the designers had intentionally aimed to make the interpretation of the concept as dissimilar to others as possible.

Slogan
The official slogan for the 2016 Summer Olympics was "A New World". It was chosen to highlight the commitment of the Games organisers towards world peace, a united world, a better place to live, as well as a legacy for future generations through the hosting of the Olympic Games. This motto was chosen on account of the fact that this edition was the first to be held in South America.

Look of the Games

Mascots

The official mascots of the 2016 Summer Olympics and Paralympics were unveiled on 24 November 2014. They were created by Sao Paulo-based animation company Birdo. The Olympic mascot Vinicius, named after musician Vinicius de Moraes, represents Brazilian wildlife and carries design traits of cats, monkeys, and birds. According to their fictional backgrounds, the mascots "were both born from the joy of Brazilians after it was announced that Rio would host the Games." Brand director Beth Lula stated that the mascots were intended to reflect the diversity of Brazil's culture and people. The names of the mascots were determined by a public vote whose results were announced on 14 December 2014; the names, which reference the co-writers of the song "The Girl from Ipanema", won over two other sets of names, tallying 44 percent of 323,327 votes. At the Olympic wrestling events, coaches were given plush dolls of Vinicius to throw into the ring when they wished to challenge a referee's call.

Video games
Alongside with the Mario and Sonic series, Overwatch, a multiplayer first-person shooter game created by Blizzard Entertainment, ran a "Summer Games" event in August 2016 that ran concurrent with the 2016 Summer Olympics. The main event was a futuristic soccer game known as "Lúcioball", named for the playable hero Lúcio, who is depicted in the game's lore as a DJ and freedom fighter from Rio de Janeiro. Rio also serves as the location for the initial arena for Lúcioball, the Estádio das Rãs (Portuguese for "Stadium of Frogs", referencing Lúcio's logo).

Virtual Reality
A basketball 360-degree video was produced in collaboration with Samsung and Two Bit Circus.

Corporate sponsorship and advertising

Sponsors

See also 

 2008 Summer Olympics marketing
 2012 Summer Olympics marketing
 2020 Summer Olympics marketing

References

Marketing
Olympic marketing